Year 1005 (MV) was a common year starting on Monday (link will display the full calendar) of the Julian calendar.

Events 
 By place 

 Europe 
 Spring – The Republic of Pisa conducts a military offensive against the Saracen strongholds in Southern Italy. The Pisan fleet sacks the city of Reggio Calabria. Pisa becomes one of the four commercial Maritime Republics (the other three are Genoa, Venice and Amalfi), which fight each other for control of the Mediterranean Sea.

 British Isles 
 March 25 – King Kenneth III of Scotland is killed in the battle of Monzievaird in Strathearn. He is succeeded by his cousin Malcolm II ("Forranach, the Destroyer", son of the late King Kenneth II) as ruler of Scotland.
 Summer – Danish Viking raiders under Sweyn Forkbeard continue to ravage the cities (mostly poorly defended) in southern England. A famine strikes Sweyn's army, which has to live off the land.
 November 16 – Ælfric of Abingdon, archbishop of Canterbury, leaves ships to the people of Wiltshire and Kent in his will, leaving the best, equipped for 60 men, to King Æthelred the Unready.
 High King of Ireland Brian Boru makes a second expedition to the north, to take hostages from the northern kingdoms. During this campaign he visits Armagh – making an offering of 20 ounces of gold to the church and confirming to the apostolic see of Saint Patrick, ecclesiastical supremacy over the whole of Ireland.

 Asia 
 January 13–18– The Shanyuan Treaty is negotiated between the Liao dynasty and the Song dynasty. The Song government agrees to pay an annual tribute of 200,000 bolts of raw silk and 100,000 taels of silver, ending the northern border clashes against Liao.
 May 13 – The Japanese court permits Fujiwara no Korechika to enter the palace.
 Lê Trung Tông succeeds his father Lê Hoàn as emperor of the early Lê dynasty (modern Vietnam), preceding anarchy and 8 months succession war with other princes. Lê Ngoạ Triều succeeds his brother Lê Trung Tông, killing him after just a 3 day reign.

 By topic 

 Arts and literature 
 The Shūi Wakashū ("Collection of Gleanings"), an anthology of waka (poetry), is compiled by ex-Emperor Kazan of Japan (approximate date).

Births 
 June 20 – al-Zahir li-i'zaz Din Allah, Fatimid caliph of Egypt (d. 1036)
 September 26 – Fujiwara no Nagaie, Japanese nobleman (d. 1064)
 A Nong, Chinese shaman and matriarch (approximate date)
 Berenguer Ramon I, Spanish nobleman (d. 1035)
 Bertha of Blois, duchess consort of Brittany (approximate date)
 Eilika of Schweinfurt, German noblewoman (approximate date)
 Frederick II, German nobleman and overlord (d. 1075)
 Llywelyn Aurdorchog, Welsh nobleman (approximate date)
 Macbeth ("Rí Deircc, the Red King"), king of Scotland (approximate date)
 Mahmud al-Kashgari, Turkish lexicographer (d. 1102)

Deaths 
 March 25 – Kenneth III ("An Donn, the Chief"), king of Scotland
 October 31 – Abe no Seimei, Japanese astrologer (b. 921)
 November 16 – Ælfric of Abingdon, archbishop of Canterbury 
 December 14 – Adalbero II, bishop of Verdun and Metz
 December 27 – Nilus the Younger, Byzantine abbot (b. 910)
 Abu Hilal al-Askari, Muslim scholar and writer (b. 920)
 Cynan ap Hywel, prince of Gwynedd (approximate date)
 Lê Hoàn, emperor of the Early Lê Dynasty (b. 941)
 Lê Trung Tông, emperor of the Early Lê Dynasty (b. 983)
 Isma'il Muntasir ("Victorious"), ruler of the Samanids
 Mael Ruanaidh Ua Dubhda, king of Connacht
 Ma Yize, Muslim astronomer of the Song Dynasty
 Ragnall mac Gofraid, king of the Isles (or 1004)
 Sigmundur Brestisson, Viking chieftain (b. 961)
 Yves de Bellême, Norman nobleman (approximate date)

References